The Center for High Impact Philanthropy is a center at the School of Social Policy and Practice at the University of Pennsylvania in the United States. The center focuses on high impact philanthropy, both in the US and internationally. The Center puts out studies, papers, and briefings on how to maximize the impact of one's philanthropy. Among the materials available on their website are: a primer on high impact philanthropy, and a guide on holiday giving.

History

According to its website, the Center for High Impact Philanthropy was established in the Spring of 2006 by the dean of the school and a small group of anonymous alumni of the Wharton School of Business (the business school of the University of Pennsylvania).

Funding

The Center for High Impact Philanthropy relies on a number of foundations for its funding, including the William and Flora Hewlett Foundation and the Ford Foundation.

Media and blog coverage

The Center for High Impact Philanthropy has been mentioned twice on the blog of charity evaluator GiveWell.

References

External links
 Website

Philanthropic organizations based in the United States
University of Pennsylvania